The Mirror is a 2014 British found footage horror film that was directed and written by Edward Boase. The movie had its world premiere on 8 September 2014 at the London FrightFest Film Festival and is based upon a 2013 news article based around a purportedly haunted mirror that left its owners "dogged by bad luck, financial misery, strange sightings and illness".

Plot
Flatmates Jemma, Matt, and Steve have decided to purchase a haunted mirror off of eBay in the hopes of winning the James Randi Foundation's Paranormal Challenge. If they can show proof of supernatural or paranormal activity that can hold up under scientific testing, they will win a million dollars. After receiving the mirror, the trio sets up cameras to record any and all events that occur around the mirror, only to find that this may prove fatal.

Cast
Jemma Dallender as Jemma
Joshua Dickinson as Matt
Nate Fallows as Steve

Reception
Nerdly panned the movie, writing "There are some note-worthy scenes of gore in The Mirror, one of which is completely spoiled by the films poster/DVD cover may I add, but even the most graphic of scenes can’t save what is a dull, mundane and ultimately annoying, horror movie." In contrast, Total Film nominated the film for two of their annual "Total Film Frightfest Awards", Best Found-Footage Horror and Scariest Movie.

References

External links

2014 horror films
British horror films
Found footage films
Camcorder films
British mockumentary films
2010s psychological horror films
2010s English-language films
2010s British films